Myosarcoma is a malignant muscle tumor. People with myosarcoma often wake up with the feeling as if they had a cramp during their sleep.

Leiomyosarcoma is sarcoma of smooth muscle, and rhabdomyosarcoma is sarcoma of striated muscle. However, the term myosarcoma itself still appears in the literature.

References

External links 

Sarcoma